Westburn may refer to:
 Westburn, South Lanarkshire, Scotland
 Westburn Grant (1985-2020), Australian race horse
 Westburn Park, Aberdeen, Scotland
 Westburn School, Ilam, New Zealand
 Westburn Viaduct, Scotland

See also
 Eastburn (disambiguation)
 Westbourne (disambiguation)